Cupcake and Dino: General Services (or Cupcake e Dino: Serviços Gerais in Portuguese) is an  animated streaming television series created by Pedro Eboli for Teletoon in Canada, Disney XD in Latin America & Brazil, and Netflix in the US.

The series follows the life of Cupcake and Dino, two brothers who strive to make a name for themselves in the General Services (odd jobs) business. It was released to Netflix on July 27, 2018.

The second and final season was released on May 3, 2019.

On 31 December 2019, Hasbro acquired Entertainment One for a $3.8 billion deal, making the series under the ownership of Hasbro.

Premise 
Cupcake & Dino: General Services revolves around a tiny cupcake and his giant dinosaur brother as they strive to make a name for themselves in the competitive General Services business (known in Brazil as "bicos"). There is a supporting cast of other anthropomorphized food, objects, animals, and mythical creatures, as well as humans. There is no apparent reason or distinction between different types of characters, with Cupcake and Dino being presented as birth siblings and having a Grandma Steak and human uncle.

Episodes follow the loose format of Cupcake and Dino taking on a general services job where unintended consequences usually follow absurd plot points. Each episode also has repeated basic themes found in young children's programming such as friendship, honesty, bravery, and loyalty—often accompanied by simple songs emphasizing these themes.

The series was animated using Adobe Animate and utilizes live-action sequences that were recycled from Shutterstock, which the crew used with permission.

Characters

Main
 Cupcake B. Goody (voiced by Justin Collette) is a magenta cupcake with a Napoleon complex, and Dino's older brother.
 Dinosaur Carol Goody (voiced by Mark Little) a yellow Tyrannosaurus rex who is Cupcake's fun-loving, optimistic younger brother.

Recurring
 Hugo (voiced by Mark Forward) is Cupcake and Dino's lovable manager and assistant.
 Chance Goody (voiced by Kyle Dooley) is Cupcake and Dino's human uncle and Grandma Steak’s son.
 Vicky (voiced by Julie Sype) is the teenage mayor of Big City and a friend of Cupcake and Dino.
 Grandma Steak (voiced by Julie Lemieux) is Cupcake and Dino's feisty grandmother and Uncle Chance’s mother.
 Peetree Gluck the Third (voiced by Joris Jarsky) is a rooster with a southern accent and Cupcake and Dino's rival.
 Sneaky Stan (voiced by Kyle Dooley) is Uncle Chance's grocery store rival.
 Officer Bees (voiced by Kayla Lorette) is a bee police officer.

Minors
Angles
Inventory Ariel
Kattycorn
Chris (the Manygoose)
Creature Magazine Editor
Blur Guy
Mr. Grumbles
Pigeon
The Internet
Bun and Iguana
Pickles (Officer Bees’ pet cat)
Cassie

Episodes

Season 1 (2018)

Season 2 (2019)

Broadcast
Cupcake & Dino: General Services was first released to Netflix as a Netflix original on July 27, 2018. The series premiered on Teletoon in Canada on September 8, 2018. In Brazil, the series began airing on November 15, 2018 on Disney XD.
The series also premiered on Disney Channel in Southeast Asia on May 25, 2020.

References

External links
 
 Cupcake & Dino: General Services on Netflix
 Cupcake & Dino: General Services on Entertainment One

English-language Netflix original programming
Netflix children's programming
2010s Brazilian animated television series
2018 Brazilian television series debuts
2019 Brazilian television series endings
2010s Canadian animated television series
2018 Canadian television series debuts
2019 Canadian television series endings
Teletoon original programming
Canadian television series with live action and animation
Fictional food characters
Animated television series about brothers
Animated television series about dinosaurs
Television series by Entertainment One
Brazilian children's animated action television series
Brazilian children's animated adventure television series
Brazilian children's animated comedy television series
Brazilian children's animated fantasy television series
Canadian children's animated action television series
Canadian children's animated adventure television series
Canadian children's animated comedy television series
Canadian children's animated fantasy television series
Portuguese-language Netflix original programming